Sangnag Chöling, is a township in Lhünzê County in the Tibet Autonomous Region of China. It lies northwest of Yümai in the Char Chu rivervalley. It contains a historic Buddhist monastery.

See also
List of towns and villages in Tibet

References

Bibliography
 
 

Populated places in Shannan, Tibet
Township-level divisions of Tibet